The Germans' Gate is a medieval bridge castle and city gate in Metz, France. It is "a relic of the medieval fortifications, with two 13th c. round towers and two gun bastions of the 15th c." It is a monument historique of France (list number: PA00106837).

References

External links

La Porte des Allemands 

Buildings and structures in Metz
City gates
Monuments historiques of Grand Est